Donald Russell may refer to:

 Donald S. Russell (1906–1998), Democratic Senator from South Carolina
 Donald Russell (classicist) (1920–2020), British educator and author
 Donald J. Russell (1900–1985), American railroad executive
 Donald Russell (American football), former American football coach
 Donald R. Russell, pharmacist and mayor of New Toronto, Ontario
 Donald Russell, a butchery company owned by Vestey Holdings